Linha Amer Jaber Ahmed (born 11 March 1997) is an Egyptian hurdler. She competed in the women's 100 metres hurdles at the 2017 World Championships in Athletics.

References

External links

1997 births
Living people
Egyptian female hurdlers
World Athletics Championships athletes for Egypt
Athletes (track and field) at the 2018 Mediterranean Games
Place of birth missing (living people)
Athletes (track and field) at the 2019 African Games
African Games competitors for Egypt
Mediterranean Games competitors for Egypt
21st-century Egyptian women